Freedom Airline Express is an airline based in Nairobi, Kenya and in Mogadishu, Somalia. It operates domestic scheduled and charter services. Its main bases are Jomo Kenyatta Internation Airport, Nairobi and Aden Adde International Airport, Mogadishu

Freedom Airline operates two Bombardier CRJ-200, two Fokker 50, five Embraer 120 ER and one A320

References

External links

Airlines of Kenya
Airlines established in 2019
Companies based in Nairobi
Kenyan companies established in 2019